Glenwood Brown (born July 25, 1967 in Plainfield, New Jersey, United States) is a former American professional boxer in the welterweight (147lb) division.

Amateur career 
Brown trained at the Plainfield Boys Club in Plainfield, New Jersey and won the 1986 New York Golden Gloves 139 lb Open Championship. Brown defeated Raul Rivera of the Apollo Boys Club in the finals to win the Championship.

Pro career 
Nicknamed "The Real Beast", Brown turned pro in 1986 and lost his first title shot in 1991 by split decision to Maurice Blocker for the vacant IBF welterweight title. In his next fight in 1992 he took on WBA welterweight title holder Meldrick Taylor but lost a decision, even though Taylor was knocked down twice. Brown went on to win the IBO Middleweight Championship in 1995, but never fought again for a major title, and retired in 2000 following a TKO loss to Scott Pemberton.
Career record: 48-12 (29 KOs).

|-

External links 
 

1967 births
Living people
African-American boxers
Boxers from New Jersey
Sportspeople from Plainfield, New Jersey
Light-middleweight boxers
Welterweight boxers
World boxing champions
American male boxers
21st-century African-American people
20th-century African-American sportspeople